Greg A. Rosenbaum (born August 7, 1952) is an American merchant banker based in Bethesda, Maryland. He is currently the co-principal owner and co-chair of the Dayton Dragons minor league baseball club, and a minority owner of the Mahoning Valley Scrappers collegiate summer baseball club.

Personal life
Rosenbaum was born to a Jewish family in Toledo, Ohio and attended Whitmer High School, the middle child of three brothers.  His father, Marvin Rosenbaum, was a furniture salesman and later the owner of a premiums and incentives distributor, and his mother, Edith Millman Rosenbaum, was a vice president at a local advertising agency. Rosenbaum graduated from Harvard College in 1974 with an A.B. in Government.  He received a joint Juris Doctor and Master of Public Policy from Harvard Law School and Harvard Kennedy School in 1978.  At Harvard Law he was a member of the winning team in the 1976 Ames Moot Court Competition. Rosenbaum is married to Marti Radlo Rosenbaum, and has three grown children and two grandchildren.

Policy debate
At Harvard, Rosenbaum was a member of the winning team at the 1974 collegiate National Debate Tournament.  In 1979, he was one of the coaches for Harvard's National Debate Tournament-winning team. Rosenbaum and his debate partner Charles Garvin were voted the second-best policy debate team of the 1970s in a poll of contemporary debate coaches and participants.

Rosenbaum serves on the board of directors of Harvard Debate, Inc, and is a former trustee and chair of the National Debate Tournament. In 2011, Rosenbaum was named to the board of directors of the National Association for Urban Debate Leagues.

Business
Rosenbaum is currently the president of Palisades Associates, Inc., a Bethesda, Maryland-based private equity firm.  He was previously a consultant with the Boston Consulting Group and a vice president of buyout firm Dyson-Kissner-Moran.

In 1987, Rosenbaum was one of the five founders of the Carlyle Group. He left within the first year.

From 2003 to 2010, he was the Chairman of TVC Communications, LLC, a distributor to the broadband industry, until its purchase by WESCO International.

From 2003 to 2012 Rosenbaum was the Chairman of Empire Kosher Poultry, Inc., the largest producer of kosher poultry in the United States, and from 2006 to 2012 he was the company's chief executive officer.

In 2014, Rosenbaum was one of the lead investors in a group that purchased the Dayton Dragons, the Class A-Advanced minor league affiliate of the Cincinnati Reds, from Mandalay Sports Entertainment.

In 2016, Rosenbaum purchased a minority interest in the Mahoning Valley Scrappers, now in the MLB Draft League.

Politics
Rosenbaum is currently on the board of the Center for American Progress Action Fund (CAP Action).

Rosenbaum served as the vice chair of the Platform Committee for the 2016 Democratic National Convention.

In 2013, President Barack Obama appointed Rosenbaum to the United States Holocaust Memorial Council, the governing body of the United States Holocaust Memorial Museum, on which he served until January 2017. From 2011 to 2016, Rosenbaum served on the board of directors of the National Jewish Democratic Council (NJDC), and from 2014 to 2016, he served as the NJDC's chair. In the 2012 election cycle, Rosenbaum was a co-chair of NJDC's political action committee.

Rosenbaum was a charter member of the Clinton Global Initiative and was listed as a donor in reports released by the Clinton Foundation. At the Harvard Kennedy School, Rosenbaum is a vice chair of the HKS Fund Executive Council and was previously a member of the Dean's Council.

Philanthropy
In 2011, the Metropolitan Council on Jewish Poverty granted Rosenbaum its Humanitarian Award. As the CEO of Empire Kosher, Rosenbaum oversaw the donation of kosher food products to community food pantries.

In 2009, the Philadelphia Jewish Labor Committee granted Rosenbaum, along with U.S. Senator Bob Casey, a Labor Human Rights Award. In 2007, the Jewish Labor Committee granted Rosenbaum a National Trade Union Council for Human Rights Award.

Rosenbaum is a past board member of the United States Olympic and Paralympic Foundation, which supports the United States Olympic and Paralympic teams, as well as the USA Swimming Foundation.

References

Harvard Law School alumni
Jewish American philanthropists
Private equity and venture capital investors
Living people
Harvard Kennedy School alumni
American chief executives of food industry companies
1952 births
Harvard College alumni
21st-century American Jews